The 1971 Houston Oilers season was the team's 12th season, and second with the National Football League. The Oilers improved on their previous season's output of three victories, winning four games in 1971. They missed the playoffs for the second consecutive season.

The 1971 Oilers are the only team in NFL history to throw three-or-more interceptions in ten different games. (The team was 2–7–1 in those games.)

Offseason

NFL draft

Roster

Schedule

Standings

References

Houston Oilers seasons
Houston Oilers
Houston